Norman Romeo Rivers (March 28, 1907 – May 4, 1986) was a Canadian ice hockey player who competed in the 1932 Winter Olympics.

He was born in Winnipeg, Manitoba.

In 1932 he was a member of the Winnipeg Hockey Club, the Canadian team which won the gold medal. He played all six matches and scored five goals.

Awards and achievements
Allan Cup Championship (1931)
Olympic Gold Metalist (1932)
World Championship Gold Medalist (1935)
“Honoured Member” of the Manitoba Hockey Hall of Fame

External links
Romeo Rivers's biography at databaseOlympics.com
Romeo Rivers's biography at Manitoba Hockey Hall of Fame

1907 births
1986 deaths
Canadian ice hockey left wingers
Ice hockey players at the 1932 Winter Olympics
Medalists at the 1932 Winter Olympics
Olympic gold medalists for Canada
Olympic ice hockey players of Canada
Olympic medalists in ice hockey
Ice hockey people from Winnipeg
Winnipeg Hockey Club players
Winnipeg Monarchs players